Translate is a translation app developed by Apple for their iOS and iPadOS devices. Introduced on June 22, 2020, it functions as a service for translating text sentences or speech between several languages and was officially released on September 16, 2020, along with iOS 14. All translations are processed through the neural engine of the device, and as such can be used offline.

On June 7, 2021, Apple announced that the app would be available on iPad models running iPadOS 15, as well as Macs running macOS Monterey. The app was officially released for iPad models on September 20, 2021, along with iPadOS 15. It was also released for Mac models on October 25, 2021, along with macOS Monterey.

On June 6, 2022, Apple announced six new languages, Turkish, Indonesian, Polish, Dutch, Thai and Vietnamese. The six new languages work on iPhone 8 or later, iPhone 8 Plus or later, iPhone X or later, iPhone SE (2nd generation) or later, iPad Air (3rd generation) or later, all iPad Pro models, iPad Mini (5th generation) or later and iPad (5th generation) or later. The Turkish, Indonesian, Polish, Dutch and Thai languages were added to the app on June 22, 2022, the second anniversary of the announcement of the app. The Vietnamese language was added to the app on July 27, 2022.

Languages
Translate originally supported the translation between the UK (British) and US (American) dialects of English, Arabic, Mandarin Chinese, French, German, the European dialect of Spanish, Italian, Japanese, Korean, the Brazilian dialect of Portuguese and Russian. This grew to 17 languages as six new languages were added in 2022, such as Turkish, Indonesian, Polish, Dutch, Thai and Vietnamese. All languages support dictation and can be downloaded for offline use.

References 

IOS-based software made by Apple Inc.
iOS software
iPadOS software
MacOS software
Machine translation software
Natural language processing software
Products introduced in 2020
2020 software